Giovanni Maistri (born 4 June 1992) is an Italian rugby union player. He plays as a hooker. He currently plays for Benetton Treviso in the Pro14.

In the 2011-12 season he played for Calvisano, whom that season completed the double and won Giovanni his first titles; National Championship of Excellence and Coppa Italia

In July 2012, Giovanni joined Pro12 side Treviso. He played his debut game against Munster on 7th Sept, coming on as a substitute.

Maistri has played in all of the Italian national youth teams, including the U-20, in which he was the captain, and with whom in 2012 he competed in the tournament U20's Six Nations and the IRB Junior World Championship .

Honours

 National Championship of Excellence
 Champions Calvisano: 2011–12
 Coppa Italia
 Champions Calvisano: 2011–12

References

External links
 http://www.itsrugby.co.uk/player-22346.html
 http://www.espn.co.uk/italy/rugby/player/158750.html

1992 births
Living people
Italian rugby union players
Benetton Rugby players
Rugby Calvisano players
Rugby union hookers